Russell Mills may refer to:

Russell Mills (artist) (born 1952), British artist
Russell Mills (architect) (1892–1959), American architect
Russell Mills (publisher) (born 1944), Canadian journalist and publisher